Palestine–Slovakia relations are bilateral relations between the State of Palestine and Slovakia. The Czechoslovak Socialist Republic recognized Palestinian statehood on 18 November 1988. The two countries established diplomatic relations on 1 January 1993. The State of Palestine has an embassy in Bratislava.

References

External links
 Embassy of Palestine in Slovakia 

Slovakia
Palestine